Esmailabad or Esmaeelabad oder Isma′ilabad may refer to:

Alborz Province
Esmailabad, Alborz
Esmailabad Shur Qaleh-ye Bala, Alborz
Esmailabad Shur Qaleh-ye Pain, Alborz

Chaharmahal and Bakhtiari Province
Esmailabad, Chaharmahal and Bakhtiari, a village in Kuhrang County

East Azerbaijan Province
Esmailabad, East Azerbaijan, a village in Sarab County

Fars Province
Esmailabad, Bavanat, a village in Bavanat County
Esmailabad, Darab, a village in Darab County
Esmailabad, Jahrom, a village in Jahrom County
Esmailabad, Kharameh, a village in Kharameh County
Esmailabad, Marvdasht, a village in Marvdasht County
Esmailabad (south), Dorudzan, a village in Marvdasht County
Esmailabad (north), Dorudzan, a village in Marvdasht County
Esmailabad, Seyyedan, a village in Marvdasht County
Esmailabad, Shiraz, a village in Shiraz County
Esmailabad, Zarqan, a village in Shiraz County

Gilan Province
Esmailabad, Gilan, a village in Rasht County

Golestan Province
Esmailabad, Golestan

Kerman Province
Esmailabad, Bardsir, a village in Bardsir County
Esmailabad, Fahraj, a village in Fahraj County
Esmailabad, Kerman, a village in Kerman County
Esmailabad, Mahan, a village in Kerman County
Esmailabad, Rafsanjan, a village in Rafsanjan County
Esmailabad, Ferdows, a village in Rafsanjan County
Esmailabad, Ravar, a village in Ravar County
Esmailabad, Zarand, a village in Zarand County

Kermanshah Province
Esmailabad, Kermanshah, a village in Sarpol-e Zahab County

Khuzestan Province
Esmailabad, Khuzestan, a village in Gotvand County

Lorestan Province
Esmailabad, Lorestan

Markazi Province
Esmailabad, Saveh, a village in Saveh County
Esmailabad, Zarandieh, a village in Zarandieh County

North Khorasan Province
Esmailabad, North Khorasan

Qazvin Province
Esmailabad, Qazvin
Esmailabad, Buin Zahra, Qazvin

Razavi Khorasan Province
Esmailabad, Bardaskan, a village in Bardaskan County
Esmailabad, Jowayin, a village in Jowayin County
Esmailabad, Mashhad, a village in Mashhad County
Esmailabad, Tus, a village in Mashhad County
Esmailabad, Torbat-e Jam, a village in Torbat-e Jam County
Esmailabad, Pain Jam, a village in Torbat-e Jam County
Esmailabad-e Gorji, a village in Torbat-e Jam County
Esmailabad, Zaveh, a village in Zaveh County

Sistan and Baluchestan Province
Esmailabad (south), Gowhar Kuh, a village in Khash County
Esmailabad (north), Gowhar Kuh, a village in Khash County
Esmailabad Rural District (Sistan and Baluchestan Province)

South Khorasan Province
Esmailabad, Darmian, a village in Darmian County
Esmailabad, Nehbandan, a village in Nehbandan County
Esmailabad, Qaen, a village in Qaen County
Esmailabad, Tabas, a village in Tabas County

Tehran Province
Esmailabad, Rey, a village in Rey County
Esmailabad-e Moin
Esmailabad Rural District (Baharestan County)

West Azerbaijan Province
Esmailabad, West Azerbaijan, a village in Poldasht County